Sumptermead Ait is an island in the River Thames in England on the reach above Old Windsor Lock, near Datchet, Berkshire. The island is a thin wooded strip separated by a narrow channel on the Datchet side. In 1995 a Thames side path was created here for the diverted Thames Path.

The island has a long history, being recorded as "Sondremede" in 1263, when given to the prioress of St Helens in London, and "Saunder-meade" in 1586, when leased to the queens laundress.

See also
Islands in the River Thames

References

Islands of Berkshire
Islands of the River Thames
Datchet